Olympia High School is a school located about  southwest of Stanford, Illinois, in McLean County. The school had a graduation rate in 2007 of 90.3%, a ratio the school's principal attributed to tough attendance regulations and after school programs. The school is part of Olympia Community Unit School District 16, which includes the towns of Atlanta, Armington, Danvers, Hopedale, McLean, Minier, Stanford, and Waynesville.

Notable alumni
Kelly Loeffler, U.S. Senator from Georgia

References

External links
Olympia High School at Olympia Community Unit School District #16
Olympia High School profile at Interactive Illinois Report Card

Public high schools in Illinois
Schools in McLean County, Illinois